Belarusians are a major ethnic group in Russia. At the census of 2010, 521,443 Russian citizens indicated Belarusian ancestry. Major Belarusian groups live in the regions of Moscow, St. Petersburg, Kaliningrad, Karelia and Siberia. Most Belarusians in Russia are migrants from modern Belarus or their descendants, while a minor part of Belarusians in Russia are indigenous.

Geography

A minor part of Belarusians in Russia are original inhabitants of the Russian-Belarusian border regions. In ancient times the regions of Smolensk and Pskov were inhabited by the East Slavic tribe of Krivichi that later became major base of the Russian and Belarusian nations. The Russian town of Smolensk was several times conquered by Polatsk dukes and belonged to the Grand Duchy of Lithuania between 1408 and 1514.

According to the census of the Russian Empire, some Belarusians lived in the territories of modern Smolensk Oblast, Bryansk Oblast. A small number of Belarusians used to live in the modern Kaluga Oblast, Pskov Oblast, Orel Oblast.

The Korenization policies of the 1920s encouraged Belarusians of Russia to promote and develop Belarusian cultural life and education. A system of Belarusian schools was established in Western Russia. In the 1930s, the Korenization was reversed and its proponents were repressed.

Moscow
During the Polonization of the Grand Duchy in the 16th and 17th centuries, a large number of Orthodox Ruthenians, led by Princes Mstislavsky, Belsky and Galitzine, escaped the repressions to Moscow. In documents of that time they are also called Litvins or White Ruthenians.

One of the compact settlements of Litvins in Moscow was the Meschanskaya Sloboda. Its inhabitants engaged in financial operations, trade, and medicine. Meschanskaya Sloboda had a degree of self-governance and a collegiate church.

In the times of Imperial Russia and the USSR, Moscow as the scientific and economic centre of the country attracted many specialists from different parts of the empire including Belarus. So, the minister of foreign affairs of the USSR during the most tensed period of the Cold War was the Belarusian Andrei Gromyko.

Today, Moscow also attracts huge numbers of specialists for constant and temporary work. Every year hundreds of students from Belarus join Moscow universities.

St. Petersburg
After the Partition of Poland, Belarusians started migrating to Russia including the imperial capital, St. Petersburg. Especially many peasants from northern and eastern regions of Belarus migrated to St. Petersburg.

According to statistics, from 1869 to 1910 the number of Belarusians in St. Petersburg grew 23 times and reached 70,000. By the end of that period Belarusians were the biggest ethnic minority in the city. During the First World War for some period up to one million Belarusians lived in the city because of inflow of refugees.

In the second half of the 19th century, several Belarusian organisations were created in St. Petersburg uniting intellectuals and students. In 1868 the enlightenment organisation Kryvitski Vazok was founded. In the 1880s the organisation of leftist Belarusian intellectuals Homan was created. Along with Wilno, St. Petersburg has been the centre of Belarusian cultural an intellectual life in the late 19th century. A Belarusian publishing house existed in St. Petersburg in 1906-1912. Belarusian scientists at the universities of St. Petersburg made important ethnographic researches about Belarus.

The activity of organisations of Belarusian diaspora continued after the October Revolution until it was violently stopped by Stalinist repressions.

During the Perestroika, several new Belarusian diaspora organisations appeared in Leningrad. Today St. Petersburg, though less than Moscow, is also attractive for workers and students from Belarus.

Siberia
Siberia was host to mass migrations from Belarus in the 19th century. Among the first were the deported participants of the January Uprising and the November uprising. During the period between 1885 and 1914, around 550,000 Belarusians settled to Siberia. Entire Belarusian villages existed there.

After the October Revolution, the stream of migrants from Belarus to Siberia did not stop. The Soviets tried to organise their flow and sanctioned research on the history and traditions of Siberian Belarusians. In 1929 the National Academy of Sciences of Belarus organised a special ethnographic expedition to Siberia. In the census of 1926, 371,840 Siberians stated their Belarusian descent.

Korenization allowed the Belarusian minority in RSFSR to develop its culture and language. Belarusian schools were created in Siberia.

In the 1930s and early 1940s many Russian, Ukrainian, and Belarusian intellectuals and peasants were deported to Siberia, including those from West Belarus following its annexation to the BSSR.

In the late 1980s the Belarusian national revival movement also affected Siberian Belarusians. The Jan Cherski Society for Belarusian Culture was established in Irkutsk and is now the largest and most active organisation of the Belarusian diaspora in Russia.

Other regions
In the 18th century Belarusians lived in several gubernyas of European Russia. Belarusian settlements existed in Kursk, Penza gubernyas and in the Ural.

After the cancellation of serfdom in Russia in the 19th century, mass migrations of Belarusian peasants to Russia started. The main destinations were the Volga region, the Caucasus, Central Asia and Siberia.

From the late 1940s to the early 1960s many Belarusians settled in Karelia, Arkhangelsk Oblast, the Komi Republic, and Kaliningrad Oblast.

Belarusian territorial autonomies in Russia

Belarusian national revival in RSFSR in early Soviet times included creation of Belarusian local autonomies - national Rural Soviets (сельсоветы) inside raions. In 1924–1926, 71 Belarusian rural soviets were created in Siberia. In 1926 there were 26 Belarusian rural soviets in the Russian Far East. In the Ural in 1928 there were eleven. Later, several Belarusian raions, administrative units of a higher level, were created. In the early 1930s there was a Belarusian national raion of Taboryn as part of the Ural oblast. There was a discussion about the creation of a Belarusian national unit inside the Omsk oblast.

In the mid-1930s all Belarusian autonomies inside the RSFSR were liquidated.

Modern state

Number of Belarusians in Russia

Because of cultural closeness of Belarusians to Russians and weakly expressed national identity, Belarusians are more than other ethnic minorities exposed to assimilation in Russia. Despite mass inflow of migrants from Belarus during last centuries, children of immigrants rarely identify themselves as Belarusians.

Currently, more and more Belarusian organisations are created in different regions of Russia.

In 2003 a Belarusian cultural society Belorusy Yugry was registered in Surgut.

The largest and strongest Belarusian diaspora organisation in Russia is the Jan Čerski Society for Belarusian Culture in Irkutsk. The organisation unites descendants of Belarusian settlers in Siberia, and has several branches and issues a newspaper.

In Moscow there is the Frantsishak Skaryna Society for Belarusian Culture and an informal union of Belarusian students. In Bashkortostan there is a Belarusian national cultural centre Siabry founded in 1996. In Kaliningrad Belarusians are united in the culture society Karalaviec.

In the last decade Belarusian community of Russia is of separate opinion on the current presidency of Alexander Lukashenko. Some organisations support the democratic opposition. Other, more recently founded organisations as the Federal National Cultural Autonomy of Belarusians in Russia are supported by the embassy of Belarus, and have a more positive opinion on the policies of the government.

Besides Russian citizens of Belarusian descent, there are about 400 thousands Belarusians currently working in Russia.

Notable Russians of Belarusian origin
Fyodor Dostoyevsky, writer, descendant of a Polesian szlachta family
Mikhail Glinka, composer, descendant of Smolensk szlachta
Sofya Kovalevskaya, Russian mathematician who made noteworthy contributions to analysis, partial differential equations and mechanics.
Dmitry Shostakovich, composer, descendant of a participant of the November uprising
 Several Russian noble families (Trubetskoy, Belsky and others) were originally Belarusian  szlachta that fled to Muscovy
Pavel Sukhoi, constructor and designer
Nikolai Nikolayevich Yudenich, commander of the Russian Imperial Army during World War I, leader of the anti-communist White movement in Northwestern Russia during the Civil War.
Andrey Vilkitsky, hydrographer and surveyor.
Ivan Khrutsky, painter
Osip Kozlovsky - composer
Iosif Goshkevich, an Imperial Russian diplomat and Orientalist 
Ivan Solonevich - philosopher, historian, writer, editor, publisher, publicist and conservative political activist.
Pavel Malyantovich -Minister of Justice of the Provisional Government (1917), Supreme Prosecutor of Russia (1917).
Boris Vilkitsky, Russian hydrographer and surveyor.
Yefim Karskiy, linguist-Slavist, ethnographer and paleographer, founder of Belarusian linguistics, literary studies and paleography, a member of numerous scientific institutions, and author of more than 100 works on linguistics, ethnography, paleography and others.
Nikolai Sudzilovsky, a revolutionary and scientist.
Lev Dovator, Soviet  major-general during WW2
Mikhail  Khodaryonok - journalist, military observer for Gazeta.Ru and Vesti FM, and a Reserve Colonel of the Russian Federation
Vasily Sokolovsky, Soviet general and Marshal of the Soviet Union who led Red Army forces on the Eastern Front during World War II. 
Ivan Yakubovsky, Marshal of the Soviet Union, twice made a Hero of the Soviet Union and serving as commander-in-chief of the Warsaw Pact from 1967 to 1976.
Yanka Kupala, poet and writer. 
Vasily Yushkevich,  Soviet Army colonel general.
Lev Artsimovich, a Soviet physicist, academician of the Soviet Academy of Sciences (1953)
Viktor Yanukovych, the fourth President of Ukraine
Aleksandra Bortich, Actress 
Innokenty Smoktunovsky, a Soviet actor acclaimed as the "king of Soviet actors".
Kazimir Malevich, Ukraine-born Russian painter of Belarusian-Polish origin
Georgy Mondzolevski, Soviet former volleyball player
Ruslan Salei, ice hockey player
Sergei Drozd, ice hockey player
Sergei Ignashevich, former professional footballer who played as central defender and is currently the manager of Russian Football National League club Torpedo Moscow.
Andrey Makarevich, Soviet and Russian rock musician and the founder of Russia's oldest still active rock band Mashina Vremeni (Time Machine).
 Artyom Borovik - journalist and media magnate. 
Vladimir Kovalyonok, Soviet cosmonaut
Oleg Novitskiy, Russian cosmonaut
Yury Olesha - Russian and Soviet novelist

References

External links
Russia and Belarus: an ethnocultural dialogue (in Russian)
Peoples of Russia: Belarusians (in Russian)
A hundred Belarusian villages in Siberia (article in Belarusian)
Federal National Cultural Autonomy of Belarusians in Russia (in Russian)

 
Ethnic groups in Russia